Sergey Kostiv (born ) is a Kazakhstani male volleyball player. He is part of the Kazakhstan men's national volleyball team. On club level he plays for Essil Vc.

References

External links
 profile at FIVB.org

1987 births
Living people
Kazakhstani men's volleyball players
Place of birth missing (living people)